The Shanlong Vegetable Park is an agricultural land in Nangan Township, Lienchiang County, Taiwan.

History
The park consists of several farmlands belong to several people. Due to the difficulty in making commercial development in the land due to many land ownership, the Lienchiang County Government decided to beautify the area and named it Shanlong Vegetables Park.

Business
Produce from this land are sent to the nearby Shizi Market to be sold locally in the Matsu Islands.

See also
 Agriculture in Taiwan

References

Farms in Taiwan
Geography of Lienchiang County
Tourist attractions in Lienchiang County
Vegetables